Kuvi is a South-Central Dravidian language spoken in the Indian state of Odisha. The language is one of two spoken by the Kandhas, with the other being the closely related and more dominant Kui language. According to the 2011 Indian census, there are around 155,000 speakers. The orthography is the Odia script. The grammatical structure of this language is comparable to other similar languages such as Kui which all fall under the classification of a Dravidian language.

Background information 
According to a study regarding population structure of tribal populations in central India, information was collected from the Koraput district of Odisha about the Kuvi Kandhas. There were 325,144 people in the district according to the 1971 census. The Kuvi Kandhas are agriculturalists, and their physical appearance is similar to other Kandha groups.

Phonology 
Within a study done by A.G. Fitzgerald and F. V. P. Schulze, they spent some time interrogating Kuvi speakers in Araku in Andhra Pradesh. Their information came from a village called Sunkarametta. They also went to Gudari to study the Kuttiya dialect of Kui, and found a Kuvi speaker. It was found that the speakers location influenced their speech. The Kuvi speaker described himself as a Parja Kandha, so some of his dialect is abbreviated by P, while the dialect studied at Araku was indicated by Su. The following vowels and consonants are necessary for the language.

All vowels have short and long forms.

Grammar 
All Central Dravidian languages are unified in gender and number distinctions. There is the distinction of masculine vs non-masculine (or feminine and non human) both in singular and plural. There is a simplex negative tense consisting of verb base + negative suffix + personal ending present in all Dravidian languages.

Kuvi language also contains a past negative tense with the structure- verb base + negative suffix + past suffix + personal ending.

Past tense

Present tense

See also
Sathupati Prasanna Sree

References

Further reading
 Burrow, T. (1943). Dravidian Studies III. Bulletin of the School of Oriental and African Studies, University of London, 11(1), 122-139. Retrieved from https://www.jstor.org/stable/609208

Dravidian languages
Endangered languages of India
Languages of Odisha
Languages of Andhra Pradesh